Charlie Baker, born in 1952, is a NASCAR driver. He made 12 Winston Cup starts in his career, with a best finish of 18th.

Charlie was better known as the most successful driver in GATR Big Rig racing history.  Early in his career, driving the midnight blue #39 Kenworth, he entered the very first GATR race at Atlanta Motor Speedway in 1979.  Charlie may have been the only driver to take part in every GATR race, from 1979 until 1993.

References

External links
 

NASCAR drivers
1952 births
Living people
American racing drivers